SOCRATES is a mnemonic acronym used by emergency medical services, physicians, nurses, and other health professionals to evaluate the nature of pain that a patient is experiencing.

Uses
SOCRATES is used to gain an insight into the patient's condition, and to allow the health care provider to develop a plan for dealing with it. It can be useful for differentiating between nociceptive pain and neuropathic pain.

Adverse effects 
SOCRATES only focuses on the physical effects of pain, and ignores the social and emotional effects of pain.

Procedure

History 
SOCRATES is often poorly used by health care providers. Although pain assessments usually cover many or most of the aspects, they rarely included all 8 aspects.

See also
 History of presenting complaint
 Medical history
 OPQRST

References

Medical mnemonics
Pain management
Mnemonic acronyms